Mikuriya (written: 御厨) is a Japanese surname. Notable people with the surname include:

, Japanese footballer
, Japanese Secretary General of the World Customs Organization
Tod H. Mikuriya (1933–2007), American cannabis researcher
, Japanese footballer

See also
Mikuriya Station (disambiguation), multiple railway stations in Japan

Japanese-language surnames